A number of sportspeople eligible for the  2016 Summer Olympics in Rio de Janeiro stated that they would not attend because of the ongoing Zika virus epidemic in Brazil. In the case of golf and tennis, media speculated that some absentees were unenthusiastic about competing in any case and used Zika as a convenient excuse.

Table

See also
 List of athletes not attending the 2020 Summer Olympics due to COVID-19 concerns
 List of athletes not attending the 2022 Winter Olympics due to COVID-19 concerns

Footnotes

References

2016 Summer Olympics
Zika virus